I-III-VI2 semiconductors are solid semiconducting materials that contain three or more chemical elements belonging to groups I, III and VI (IUPAC groups 1/11, 13 and 16) of the periodic table. They usually involve two metals and one chalcogen. Some of these materials have a direct bandgap, Eg, of approximately 1.5 eV, which makes them efficient absorbers of sunlight and thus potential solar cell materials. A fourth element is often added to a I-III-VI2 material to tune the bandgap for maximum solar cell efficiency. A representative example is copper indium gallium selenide (CuInxGa(1–x)Se2, Eg = 1.7–1.0 eV for x = 0–1), which is used in copper indium gallium selenide solar cells.

CuGaO2
CuGaO2 exists in two main polymorphs, α and β. The α form has the delafossite crystal structure and can be prepared by reacting Cu2O with Ga2O3 at high temperatures. The β form has a wurtzite-like crystal structure (space group Pna21); it is metastable, but exhibits a long-term stability at temperatures below 300 °C. It can be obtained by an ion exchange of Na+ ions in a β-NaGaO2 precursor with Cu+ ions in CuCl under vacuum, to avoid the oxidation of Cu+ to Cu2+.

Unlike most I-III-VI2 oxides, which are transparent, electrically insulating solids with a bandgap above 2 eV, β-CuGaO2 has a direct bandgap of 1.47 eV, which is favorable for solar cell applications. In contrast, β-AgGaO2 and β-AgAlO2 have an indirect bandgap. Undoped β-CuGaO2 is a p-type semiconductor.

AgGaO2 and AgAlO2

Similarly to CuGaO2, α-AgGaO2 and α-AgAlO2 have the delafossite crystal structure while the structure of the corresponding β phases is similar to wurtzite (space group Pna2a). β-AgGaO2 is metastable and can be synthesized by ion exchange with a β-NaGaO2 precursor. The bandgaps of β-AgGaO2 and β-AgAlO2 (2.2 and 2.8 eV respectively) are indirect; they fall into the visible range and can be tuned by alloying with ZnO. For this reason, both materials are hardly suitable for solar cells, but have potential applications in photocatalysis.

Contrary to LiGaO2, AgGaO2 can not be alloyed with ZnO by heating their mixture because of the Ag+ reduction to metallic silver; therefore, magnetron sputtering of AgGaO2 and ZnO targets is used instead.

LiGaO2 and LiGaTe2

Pure single crystals of β-LiGaO2 with a length of several inches can be grown by the Czochralski method. Their cleaved surfaces have lattice constants that match those of ZnO and GaN and are therefore suitable for epitaxial growth of thin films of those materials. β-LiGaO2 is a potential nonlinear optics material, but its direct bandgap of 5.6 eV is too wide for visible light applications. It can be reduced down to 3.2 eV by alloying β-LiGaO2 with ZnO. The bandgap tuning is discontinuous because ZnO and β-LiGaO2 do not mix but form a Zn2LiGaO4 phase when their ratio is between ca. 0.2 and 1.

LiGaTe2 crystals with a size up to 5 mm can be grown in three steps. First, Li, Ga, and Te elements are fused in an evacuated quartz ampoule at 1250 K for 24 hours. At this stage Li reacts with the ampoule walls, releasing heat, and is partly consumed. In the second stage, the melt is homogenized in a sealed quartz ampoule, which is coated inside with pyrolytic carbon to reduce Li reactivity. The homogenization temperature is selected ca. 50 K above the melting point of LiGaTe2. The crystals are then grown from the homogenized melt by the Bridgman–Stockbarger technique in a two-zone furnace. The temperature at the start of crystallization is a few degrees below the LiGaTe2 melting point. The ampoule is moved the cold zone at a rate of 2.5 mm/day for 20 days.

m stands for metastable, d for direct and i for indirect bandgap

See also
List of semiconductor materials

References